Rhinella atacamensis, sometimes called the Vallenar toad or Atacama toad, is a species of toad in the family Bufonidae. It is endemic to Chile and occurs between Paposo (Antofagasta Region) and Las Chilcas (Valparaíso Region). It inhabits the desert Pacific coastal region with Mediterranean influences (including the Chilean matorral) and is found in and near oases and streams. Breeding takes place in permanent pools (including water tanks for livestock), streams, and rivers. While abundant at a few sites, it has declined overall and gone locally extinct at some sites. Threats to this species include extensive droughts and water pollution as well as extraction of surface water, mining, agriculture, livestock farming, and timber plantations.

References

atacamensis
Endemic fauna of Chile
Amphibians of Chile
Atacama Desert
Chilean Matorral
Vulnerable animals
Vulnerable biota of South America
Amphibians described in 1962
Taxonomy articles created by Polbot
Taxa named by José Miguel Alfredo María Cei